Vadu Moților is a commune located in Alba County, Transylvania, Romania. It has a population of 1,558, and is composed of twelve villages: Bodești, Burzești, Dealu Frumos, Lăzești, Necșești, Poduri-Bricești, Popeștii de Jos, Popeștii de Sus, Tomuțești, Toțești, Vadu Moților, and Vâltori. Until January 1, 1965, both the commune and the village of Vadu Moților were named Secătura.

The commune belongs to the Țara Moților ethnogeographical region.

Vadu Moților lies on the banks of the river Arieșul Mare, at the confluence with its tributary, the river Neagra.

References

Communes in Alba County
Localities in Transylvania